The Prospect Park station is an express station on the BMT Brighton Line of the New York City Subway. Located in between Lincoln Road, Lefferts Avenue, Empire Boulevard, Ocean Avenue and Flatbush Avenue in Flatbush, Brooklyn, near the border of Crown Heights, Prospect Heights, Park Slope, and Prospect Lefferts Gardens, it is served by the Q train and Franklin Avenue Shuttle at all times and by the B train on weekdays.

History 

This station opened on July 2, 1878 when the Brooklyn, Flatbush and Coney Island Railway established it as the Brighton Line's temporary northern terminus on what was then known as the Willink Entrance to Prospect Park. On August 18, 1878, the line was completed north to Bedford Terminal with a connection to the Long Island Rail Road. 

In 1918, the station began a rebuilding in order to accommodate the new subway connection to the Manhattan Bridge and Montague Street Tunnel. This rebuilding contributed to the Malbone Street Wreck on November 1 of that year, when a train of elevated cars derailed on the then-new curve leading to what is now the unused southbound local track. At least 93 individuals died, making it one of the U.S.'s deadliest train crashes.

The connection to the bridge and lines in Manhattan was completed on August 1, 1920, with four-track express service beginning south of this station.

The Prospect Park station was the closest station to Ebbets Field, home of the Brooklyn Dodgers until the team moved to Los Angeles after the 1957 season. The stadium was located at Bedford Avenue and Sullivan Place three blocks to the east and one block to the north. That area is now occupied by the Ebbets Field Apartments.

This station was the site of an October 15, 2008 NYPD arrest in which it was alleged that the suspect had been sodomized, leading to both criminal action and a lawsuit against the NYPD. All of the officers involved were acquitted and the lawsuit thrown out.

In November 2019, officials installed a bronze memorial plaque at the Prospect Park station's northern exit in commemoration of the Malbone Street Wreck.

Station layout

This open cut station has four tracks and two island platforms. Both platforms have red canopies with green frames and support columns that run for the either length. Every other column has the standard black station name plate in white lettering.

At the north end of the station, the two express tracks, used by B and Q trains, ramp down into a tunnel under Flatbush Avenue parallel to the IRT Eastern Parkway Line before merging with the BMT Fourth Avenue Line at DeKalb Avenue while the local tracks curve to the northeast and become an open cut after a short tunnel towards Franklin Avenue. The platforms are split into two sections at this end separated by a beige concrete wall. The Franklin Avenue Shuttle terminates on the northbound local track while the southbound one is only used for train storage or construction reroutes.

South of the station, there are crossovers and switches as the Brighton Line becomes a four-track corridor to Ocean Parkway. B trains stay on the express track and run to Brighton Beach; Q trains switch to the local track and run to Coney Island–Stillwell Avenue.

Artwork
The 1994 artwork here is called Brighton Clay Re-Leaf by Susan Tunick. It features ceramic tiles in both station entrances/exits that depict leaves to symbolize Prospect Park. This artwork is also at Parkside Avenue.

Exits

The station has two entrances/exits. The full-time one is at the extreme south end. A single double-wide staircase and ADA-accessible elevators go up from each platform to a beige ground level station house that is on the north side of the Lincoln Road overpass above the platforms between Ocean and Flatbush Avenues. Each platform elevator is connected to the station house by a glass-enclosed passageway above their respective platforms. There is a bank of turnstiles, a waiting area that allows a free transfer between directions and a token booth inside the station house. Additionally, there is a private preschool immediately adjacent to the station house entrance.

The station's other entrance/exit at the north end is un-staffed. Two staircases from each platform at the tunnel portal go up to a waiting area, where a bank of turnstiles and one exit-only turnstile lead to a mezzanine that had its part-time token booth removed in 2010. Outside fare control, a single staircase goes up to a small plaza with an ornate fence between two buildings on the west side of Flatbush Avenue between Ocean and Lefferts Avenues. An inscribed bronze plaque to the Malbone Street Wreck, installed in 2019, is located on the wall outside the northern exit.

References

External links 

 
 nycsubway.org — Brighton Clay Re-Leaf Artwork by Susan Tunick (1994)
 Station Reporter — B Train
 Station Reporter — Q Train
 Station Reporter — Franklin Shuttle
 The Subway Nut — Prospect Park Pictures
 MTA's Arts For Transit — Prospect Park (BMT Brighton Line)
 Lincoln Road entrance from Google Maps Street View
 Flatbush Avenue entrance from Google Maps Street View
 Platforms from Google Maps Street View

BMT Brighton Line stations
BMT Franklin Avenue Shuttle stations
New York City Subway stations in Brooklyn
New York City Subway terminals
Railway stations in the United States opened in 1878
New York City Subway transfer stations
Flatbush, Brooklyn
Prospect Park (Brooklyn)
1878 establishments in New York (state)